The 2003 NCAA Division I Men's Golf Championship was a golf tournament contested May 27–30, 2003, at the Karsten Creek Golf Course in Stillwater, Oklahoma. It was the 65th NCAA Division I Men's Golf Championship. The team championship was won by the Clemson Tigers, their first, who won by two strokes over the Oklahoma State Cowboys. The individual national championship was won by Alejandro Cañizares from Arizona State.

Regional qualifying tournaments
Three regional qualifying tournaments were held May 15–17.  The ten teams with the lowest team scores from each regional qualified for both the team and individual national championships.  The top two individuals in each regional whose teams did not qualify also qualified for the individual national championship.

Venue

This was the first NCAA Division I Men's Golf Championship held at Karsten Creek in Stillwater, Oklahoma.  The course would also host the 2011 championship.

Team competition
Par, single-round: 288
Par, total: 1,152

Eliminated after 54 holes: Duke (920), Minnesota (920), Illinois (921), Oregon (924), Tennessee (925), New Mexico (928), Vanderbilt (930), Kentucky (942), Arkansas (947), SMU (953), South Carolina (955), San Diego State (965)

Individual competition
Par, single-round: 72
Par, total: 288

References

NCAA Men's Golf Championship
Golf in Oklahoma
NCAA Division I Men's Golf Championship
NCAA Division I Men's Golf Championship
NCAA Division I Men's Golf Championship
NCAA Division I Men's Golf Championship